Robert P. French was a Secretary of the Pennsylvania Emergency Management Agency.

References

Living people
State cabinet secretaries of Pennsylvania
Year of birth missing (living people)